Aunty Donna is an Australian surrealist comedy group formed in Melbourne in 2011. The group consists of performers and writers Mark Bonanno, Broden Kelly, and Zachary Ruane alongside writer and director Sam Lingham, director Max Miller, and composer Thomas Zahariou. Their work spans numerous live shows, a YouTube channel, a podcast, a studio album, the Netflix series Aunty Donna's Big Ol' House of Fun, and the picture book Always Room for Christmas Pud.

History
Aunty Donna was formed in 2011 after its five original members (Mark Bonanno, Broden Kelly, Joe Kosky, Sam Lingham, and Zachary Ruane) met at University of Ballarat's Arts Academy. Trained as actors, the group saw a lack of demand for independent theatre and decided to attempt comedy instead, beginning as live performers. Their first live show, Aunty Donna in Pantsuits, debuted in 2012 at the Melbourne International Comedy Festival (MICF) and was nominated for a Golden Gibbo award, which pushed the group to continue making comedy.

Composer Thomas Zahariou and director Max Miller, who Kelly and Zahariou knew from high school, joined the group soon after its founding, while members Adrian Dean and Joe Kosky departed Aunty Donna to pursue other ventures, bringing the group to the current six members. Their second live show, Aunty Donna and the Fax Machine Shop, debuted at the Melbourne Fringe Festival in 2012.

2014 saw their third live show, World's Greatest Showbag, at the MICF, as well as a Best Of live show that debuted the group internationally at both the SF Sketchfest and Edinburgh Festival Fringe.

In 2015, the group created a self-titled half-hour television pilot for the ABC and Screen Australia as part of the inaugural Fresh Blood Pilot Season comedy initiative, but the series was not picked up.

In 2016, the group released the web series 1999, based on the Y2K panic and funded by Screen Australia as part of their Skip Ahead talent development initiative. Their most famous video at the time was "Bikie Wars", featuring John Wood of Blue Heelers fame. The group began the weekly Aunty Donna Podcast.

In 2017, the group announced a second half-hour pilot, Chaperones, which was created with Australian online streaming service Stan. The pilot was again not continued into a full series. The group adopted the mantra "whatever's funniest," attempting to adapt their source material uniquely to different comedic formats such as their live shows and YouTube sketches. Their live show Big Boys was the group's first North American theater tour.

2018 saw the release of the group's first full-length studio album, The Album, which featured Montaigne, Matt Okine, Michelle Brasier, and Joey Walker of King Gizzard & the Lizard Wizard, and was followed by a tour. Their production company, Haven't You Done Well Productions, was established. The group also released the sketch Always Room for Christmas Pud, which the Australian Financial Review later said had become "something of a Millennial cultural touchstone in Australia".

Making use of their production company, the group released the Glennridge Secondary College web series in 2019, which followed a fictional Australian secondary school.

In November 2020, Aunty Donna released their Netflix series Aunty Donna's Big Ol' House of Fun, which featured guest appearances from Ed Helms, "Weird Al" Yankovic, Antony Starr, Kristen Schaal, and others. The show was aided by Helms' Pacific Electric Picture Company. To promote the show, the group erected a replica of the Utah monolith in Melbourne with help from YouTubers I Did a Thing and Aleksa Vulovic.

In 2021, Aunty Donna hosted the Opening Night Comedy Allstars Supershow at the MICF.

2022 saw The Magical Dead Cat Tour, the group's first live tour in three years after it was delayed by COVID-19 lockdowns, covering Australia and New Zealand. In August 2022, the group announced that they had been signed by ABC to create a new TV series which will depict them running a café in the Melbourne laneways. Later in the year, the group released Always Room for Christmas Pud, a picture book published by Penguin Books and illustrated by James Fosdike, based on their popular YouTube video of the same name. The trio also provided voices for characters in the 2023 film Dungeons & Dragons: Honor Among Thieves.

Stage shows
Aunty Donna stated on their podcast that their live shows are "deep down, what [they] are most passionate about". As such, they try to plan and perform one live show per year.

YouTube
In December 2012, Aunty Donna created Aunty Donna's Rumpus Room, a seven-part web series which originally aired on C31 Melbourne and its YouTube channel. Much of its YouTube content is based on content adapted from its live shows, and many of the group's original YouTube videos become adapted for their live shows.

The majority of Aunty Donna's YouTube content is organized by the group into different series. These series include:

 Rumpus Room (2012)
 Fortnightly Fap Off (2013)
 Fapé in the Cafe (2013)
 Haven't You Done Well (2013–present)
 Fresh Blood (2014)
 1999 (2015/2016)
 Trendy (2016)
 Ripper Aussie Summer (2017)
 BEST CONTENT EVER!!1! (2017)
 Aunty Donna: The Album (2018)
 Camp Bush Camp (2018)
 Glennridge Secondary College (2019)
 The Rove Tapes (2020)
 The House Series (2022)

Typically, the videos released in these series are unified by a setting or theme, such as in Glennridge Secondary College, in which most sketches takes place in a fictionalized secondary school, and Trendy, which pokes fun at cultural trends of the mid-2010s. Haven't You Done Well is an ongoing series consisting of one video from each of the other series. All of these are unified by their loose structure, relying more heavily on improvisation than the other videos from the group and often resulting in the group making a mess of the set with a particular item, such as sunscreen, beer, wine, cake, or prop cocaine. 1999 was originally developed as a 10-part web series exclusively for YouTube as part of Screen Australia and Google's Skip Ahead funding.

Podcast
The group began a self-titled podcast in 2016, releasing weekly episodes. The podcast involves random riffing and improvised segments, and occasionally includes special guests such as comedians Ben Russell, Tim Minchin, "Weird Al" Yankovic, Bob Saget, Demi Lardner, Michelle Brasier, Rove McManus, and others. The podcast has since changed towards focusing more on how sketches, characters, and comedic ideas develop during the groups' creative process, but remains very loose in structure. Episodes will start off with a base premise of some sort that is then improvised on. For example, the character Moogie Woogie was created from a mispronunciation and went on to appear in Aunty Donna's Big Ol' House of Fun due to being a fan favorite.

Music
In 2018, Aunty Donna announced they would be releasing their debut album The Album on 6 April 2018. On 9 February 2018, Aunty Donna released the first single from the album, "Chuffed (Dad Song)", and accompanying video. The album debuted at No. 30 on the ARIA Albums Chart.

Discography

Studio albums

Haven't You Done Well Productions 
Haven't You Done Well Productions is a production company established by the members of Aunty Donna in 2018, with the aim of assisting and educating online creatives to develop and produce comedy projects, as well as to ensure they retain ownership of their own projects. The company is mentored by Andy Lee. In 2019, it received funding from Screen Australia, sharing a pool of $1.2 million for sector and talent development.

The company produced Aunty Donna's webseries Glennridge Secondary College as well as Aunty Donna's Big Ol' House of Fun, and is also producing the upcoming Aunty Donna's Untitled Project. It has produced several comedy webseries which are hosted on the YouTube channel Grouse House, including Hug The Sun (2021) featuring Ben Russell and Xavier Michelides, Hot Department: Dark Web (2022), and Finding Yeezus (2022), a  six-part documentary web series that revealed the identity of the creator of the 2013 video game Kanye Quest 3030.

Influences 
The group has cited Monty Python as the largest influence upon their comedy. Ruane has also cited Shaun Micallef as an influence.

Awards and nominations

|-
| rowspan="2"| 2012
| Melbourne International Comedy Festival
| Golden Gibbo Award
| Aunty Donna in Pantsuits
| 
| 
|-
| Melbourne Fringe Festival
| People's Choice Award
| Aunty Donna and the Fax Machine Shop
| 
| 
|-
| 2013
| Melbourne WebFest
| Melbourne's Best Prize
| Aunty Donna's Rumpus Room
| 
| 
|-
| 2014
| 9th AACTA Awards
| Best Online Drama or Comedy
| Glennridge Secondary College
| 
| 
|-
| rowspan="2"| 2016
| Melbourne WebFest
| Best Ensemble
| 1999
|  
| 
|-
| Sydney Comedy Festival
| Director's Choice
| Aunty Donna
|  
| 
|-
| 2017
| Helpmann Awards
| Best Comedy Performer
| Big Boys
|  
| 
|-
| 2018
| ARIA Music Awards
| Best Comedy Release
| Aunty Donna: The Album
|  
| 
|-
| 2019
| Melbourne WebFest
| Best Australian Comedy
| Glennridge Secondary College
|  
| 
|-
| rowspan="4"| 2021
| rowspan="4"| 11th AACTA Awards
| Best Narrative Comedy Series
| Aunty Donna's Big Ol' House of Fun
| 
| 
|-
| rowspan="2"| Best Comedy Performer
| Mark Bonanno
| 
| 
|-
| Broden Kelly
| 
| 
|-
| Best Original Score in Television
| Aunty Donna's Big Ol' House Of Fun - Episode 1: Housemates
| 
| 
|-

References

External links 
 
 
 

Australian comedy troupes
Federation University Australia alumni
Performing groups established in 2011
Surreal comedy
Australian YouTubers
Comedy YouTubers